"Alley Cat", also known as "Alleycat" and "The Alley Cat," is a popular instrumental song made most famous by the Danish pianist and composer Bent Fabric, released in 1962. Fabric (born Bent Fabricius-Bjerre) wrote the tune under the pseudonym Frank Björn.

History
The song was originally released in November, 1961, under the Danish title "Omkring et flygel," which means "Around a Piano." In 1962, the Bent Fabric composition reached number 7 on the Billboard Hot 100 chart and number 2 on the Billboard Adult Contemporary chart. In Australia, it went to number 2 and in Germany it went to number 49. It also won a Grammy Award for Best Rock & Roll Recording during the 5th Grammy Awards. It sold over one million copies and was awarded a gold disc. Siw Malmkvist recorded the song in Swedish, "Våran katt", in Danish, "Vores kat" and in German, "Schwarzer Kater Stanislaus" (1962).

Critical reception
The song received generally positive reviews. Matt Dennis of the Windsor Star said it had an "infectious, toe-tapping tempo."

Chart history

Weekly charts

Year-end charts

Notable recordings

 Ray Conniff
 Bent Fabric
 Chet Atkins
 Al Hirt
 Peggy Lee
 Siw Malmkvist (in German)
 Berl Olswanger and the Berl Olswanger Orchestra (1964)
 Bobby Rydell
 David Thorne (reached #76 on the Billboard Hot 100 in November 1962)
 Kidsongs

Popular culture
The song has appeared in numerous films, including: 
The 1989 film Shag, starring Phoebe Cates and Bridget Fonda
The 1994 film Cabin Boy, starring Chris Elliott and Andy Richter
The 1999 film Just Looking, starring Ryan Merriman
The 2000 film Duets, starring Gwyneth Paltrow and Huey Lewis
The 2004 film Imaginary Heroes, starring Sigourney Weaver and Emile Hirsch.  
It was also used in multiple episodes of Get a Life, such as "Zoo Animals on Wheels."  
The song appeared in two episodes of Family Guy.  
In "The Wedding Affair," the fifteenth episode of Season 1 of Mad About You, Paul and Jamie Buchman (Paul Reiser and Helen Hunt respectively) make an uninspiring attempt at dancing to the instrumental with forearms and hands somewhat extended forward and fingers pointed downward to mimic a cat's paws and listlessly saying "meow" at the end of the refrains.
It is also frequently used by ice cream trucks in the US.

References

External links
 

1962 singles
Al Hirt songs
Atco Records singles
Metronome Records singles
Columbia Graphophone Company singles
1962 songs
Pop instrumentals
1960s instrumentals